Sun Man (born July 23, 1968) is a Chinese female badminton player who competed internationally in the 1990s.

Career

Specializing in mixed doubles at the world level, Sun won the China Open (1993) and Asian Championships (1994) with countryman Chen Xingdong. She earned a bronze medal at the 1996 Olympics in Atlanta with another Chinese player, Liu Jianjun.

External links
profile

1968 births
Living people
Badminton players from Jiangsu
Badminton players at the 1996 Summer Olympics
Olympic badminton players of China
Olympic bronze medalists for China
Olympic medalists in badminton
Chinese female badminton players
Medalists at the 1996 Summer Olympics